Fathia Absie is a Somali-American writer, producer, actor and filmmaker. She has worked with both documentaries, as well as fictional narratives, and published a graphic novel titled, The Imperceptible Peace Maker. Fathia is the co-founder of Eat With Muslims, a project designed to bring Muslims and non-Muslims together over dinner and stories in the hopes of building bridges between neighbors and communities of different faiths and cultures.

Career
Absie moved to Minnesota around 2010 and was formerly a social worker. She has worked for a number of organizations, including the Ohio Department of Job and Family Services in Columbus, Ohio, the University of Washington in Seattle, and Voice of America in Washington D.C. Absie stars in her own film, The Lobby,  about a relationship between a white man and a Somali-American woman. In 2013, she joined ECHO, a Minnesota-based non-governmental organization serving immigrant communities.

In 2011, Absie released her first documentary film, Broken Dreams, a documentary that explores the collective outcry against the recruitment of the Somali youth in Minnesota by religious fanatics. The case brought unwanted attention from the U.S. government to the Somali community in Minnesota and around the country. Following the disappearance of the young Somali men, the FBI launched the largest US counter-terrorism investigation since the 9/11 tragedy. In 2014, Absie published a graphic novel, The Imperceptible Peacemaker, through CreateSpace, a self-publishing service owned by Amazon. An allegory of vigilante justice, its superhero protagonist, and a tech billionaire create a suit that gives him the ability to become an invisible force for good, fighting tyranny and injustice around the world. Ms. Absie also worked with Twin Cities PBS where she hosted countless programs and the documentary,  Giving Thanks!   2016 Fathia Absie was the Drama film directed by Musa Syeed · About a young Muslim refugee in Minneapolis crosses paths with a stray dog. Absie played Barkhad Abdirahman's mother. https://www.imdb.com/title/tt5447852/

In 2015, Absie released her second film, the fictional narrative The Lobby, which she starred in as well as wrote and directed. It premiered at the Minneapolis–Saint Paul International Film Festival in April of the year. This was a fictional story about the relationship between a white man and a Somali-American woman. November 2017, Absie reunites with Barkhad Abdirahman, this time playing him and Faysal Ahmed’s feisty mother at Eric Tretbar’s film, “First Person Plural” A modern-day Romeo and Juliet, starring Faysal Ahmed and Broadway great, Pearce Bunting among others. Absie begins the preproduction of a narrative called "Grapes Of Heaven" A heartbroken Somali-American woman and a writer visiting the small coastal town of Berbera, Somaliland where a famous Somali poet named Bodheri died of a broken heart in the 1930s.

Filmography
Broken Dreams (2011)
The Lobby (2015)
A Stray (2016)

Works
The Imperceptible Peace Maker (2014)

References

External links

Living people
Ethnic Somali people
Somalian women film directors
American women film directors
Somalian journalists
Somalian women journalists
Somalian emigrants to the United States
Year of birth missing (living people)
African-American Muslims
African-American film directors
African-American journalists
21st-century African-American people
21st-century African-American women